UNES FC Barcelona is a Spanish wheelchair basketball team. It is part of both the FC Barcelona family and the UNES Unió Esportiva.

History
From 2001 until 2009, the team agreed collaboration terms with Fundació Institut Guttmann. The latter is a hospital in Catalonia that provides treatment and rehabilitation for people with spinal injury, brain damage, and other neurological disabilities. It is named after Dr. Sir Ludwig Guttmann, founder of the Paralympics and a pioneer of wheelchair sports.  Club Esportiu Institut Guttmann was founded in 1967 and is the oldest disabled sports club in Spain. As well as a basketball team it also has boccia, hockey, and wheelchair tennis teams,  and promotes athletics, weightlifting, archery, and table tennis. 

In 2009, UNES Unió Esportiva collaborates with FC Barcelona which manages the main wheelchair basketball squad.

In 2011, the club resigned to its berth in División de Honor, where it competed since 2000.

Season by season

References

External links
UNES website
The section at FC Barcelona website

FC Barcelona
Parasports teams
Wheelchair basketball teams in Spain
Catalan basketball teams